Franz Carr (born 24 September 1966) is an English former professional footballer who played as a winger from 1984 until 2000. He made 131 appearances in seven years with Nottingham Forest, and had shorter spells in the Premier League or Football League with Sheffield Wednesday, West Ham United, Newcastle United, Sheffield United, Leicester City, Aston Villa, Bolton Wanderers and West Bromwich Albion. He also spent time in Italy with Reggiana.

Career
Carr began his career with Blackburn Rovers, but before making a first team appearance was signed for £25,000 rising to £100,000 by Nottingham Forest in August 1984.

After arriving at Forest, Carr was seen as a hugely exciting and popular winger who, at his peak, was one of the fastest players off the mark. Mostly playing down the right wing, he was a regular target for midfielder Neil Webb and striker Nigel Clough to chip balls over the opposing left-back. He was highly exciting but lacked a good final ball, much to the ire of manager Brian Clough. Clough described Carr in typical idiosyncratic fashion as the best bloody corner flag hitter in the country, if only that was where the net was. Despite this, Carr still contributed to Forest's Football League Cup triumphs in 1989 and 1990.

However, he lost his place in the first team during the 1989-90 season, managing just 14 league appearances and one goal. He joined relegation strugglers Sheffield Wednesday on loan, making 12 goalless appearances in the First Division.

He featured 13 times for Forest in the 1990-91 season, scoring twice, though his part in their run to the FA Cup final (which they lost to Tottenham Hotspur) was minimal. He also had a loan spell with West Ham United, playing three times in their Second Division promotion campaign.

Carr transferred to Newcastle United on 13 June 1991 for £250,000, playing under Osvaldo Ardiles. He scored on his debut as part of a 2–1 loss away to Charlton Athletic, with his second goal coming against Plymouth Argyle in September. A knee injury forced him to miss the majority of the season, returning to play the final three games, at which point Kevin Keegan had taken charge. Carr was sold in January 1993 to Sheffield United for £180,000 after being replaced by Rob Lee.

He continued to play in the Premier League with Sheffield United, Leicester City and Aston Villa before winding down his career with a move to Reggiana and short spells with Bolton Wanderers and West Bromwich Albion.

Despite only playing three league games in two seasons at Aston Villa, he scored the winning goal for them in their FA Cup quarter-final against his old club Nottingham Forest in the 1995–96 season, enabling them to reach the semi-finals in which they were beaten by Liverpool.

Personal life
Carr now lives in Golden Valley, Derbyshire.

Honours
Nottingham Forest
League Cup: 1989–90
Full Members' Cup: 1988–89,

References

External links

1966 births
Footballers from Preston, Lancashire
Living people
Association football wingers
English footballers
England under-21 international footballers
Blackburn Rovers F.C. players
Nottingham Forest F.C. players
Sheffield Wednesday F.C. players
West Ham United F.C. players
Newcastle United F.C. players
Sheffield United F.C. players
Leicester City F.C. players
Aston Villa F.C. players
A.C. Reggiana 1919 players
Bolton Wanderers F.C. players
West Bromwich Albion F.C. players
English Football League players
Premier League players
Serie A players
English expatriate footballers
English expatriate sportspeople in Italy
Expatriate footballers in Italy
Black British sportspeople